Sibona Jimmy (born 29 December 1992) is a Papua New Guinean cricketer. She played for the Papua New Guinea women's national cricket team in the 2017 Women's Cricket World Cup Qualifier in February 2017.

In June 2018, she was named in Papua New Guinea's squad for the 2018 ICC Women's World Twenty20 Qualifier tournament. She made her Women's Twenty20 International (WT20I) for Papua New Guinea against Bangladesh in the World Twenty20 Qualifier on 7 July 2018. Following the conclusion of the tournament, she was named as the rising star of Papua New Guinea's squad by the International Cricket Council (ICC).

In April 2019, she was named in Papua New Guinea's squad for the 2019 ICC Women's Qualifier EAP tournament in Vanuatu. In August 2019, she was named in Papua New Guinea's squad for the 2019 ICC Women's World Twenty20 Qualifier tournament in Scotland. She was the leading run-scorer and wicket-taker for Papua New Guinea in the tournament, with 97 runs and eight dismissals in five matches. In October 2021, she was named in Papua New Guinea's team for the 2021 Women's Cricket World Cup Qualifier tournament in Zimbabwe.

References

External links
 

1992 births
Living people
Papua New Guinean women cricketers
Papua New Guinea women Twenty20 International cricketers
Place of birth missing (living people)